Gunnar Pétursson Thorsteinsson (26 June 1894 – 5 March 1921) was an Icelandic footballer. He is considered one of Iceland's first great footballers.

Early life and family
Gunnar was the son of the entrepreneur Pétur J. Thorsteinsson and Ásthildur Guðmundsdóttir. He grew up in Copenhagen and Reykjavík. Among Gunnar's siblings were footballers Friðþjófur Thorsteinsson and Samúel Thorsteinsson and artist Guðmundur "Muggur" Thorsteinsson.

Gunnar joined Fram in 1913, quickly becoming one of their best players. He was the Icelandic tournaments top goal scorer during the 1917 season.

Death
In the fall of 1919, Gunnar fell ill with pulmonary tuberculosis. He died in May 1921 in Søllerød, Denmark, from the illness. At the time of his death, he was engaged to Nína Sæmundsdóttir.

Honours, trophies and achievements

Titles
Icelandic Championships (3):
 1913, 1914, 1918

Individual
Icelandic tournament top goal scorer:
 1917

References

1894 births
1921 deaths
Association football midfielders
Gunnar Thorsteinsson
Gunnar Thorsteinsson
20th-century deaths from tuberculosis
Tuberculosis deaths in Denmark